Bianka Pap (born 7 February 2000) is a Hungarian para-swimmer.

Career
At the 2014 IPC Swimming European Championships she won the bronze medal in the women's 100 metre backstroke S10 event.

She competed at the 2016 Summer Paralympics where she won the silver medal in the 100 m backstroke S10 and the bronze medal in the 200 m individual medley SM10.

At the 2018 World Para Swimming European Championships she won the gold medal in the women's 100 metres backstroke S10 event, the silver medal in the women's 400 metres freestyle S10 event and the bronze medal in the women's 200 metres individual medley S10 event.

References

External links
IPC Swimming profile

2000 births
Living people
Hungarian female backstroke swimmers
S10-classified Paralympic swimmers
Paralympic swimmers of Hungary
Paralympic gold medalists for Hungary
Paralympic silver medalists for Hungary
Paralympic bronze medalists for Hungary
Paralympic medalists in swimming
Swimmers at the 2016 Summer Paralympics
Swimmers at the 2020 Summer Paralympics
Medalists at the 2016 Summer Paralympics
Medalists at the 2020 Summer Paralympics
Medalists at the World Para Swimming Championships
Medalists at the World Para Swimming European Championships
Hungarian female medley swimmers
Hungarian female freestyle swimmers
Sportspeople from Baranya County